Yannick Brugger (born 27 January 2001) is a German professional footballer who plays as a centre-back.

Career
Brugger is a youth product of the academies of 1860 Munich, Bayern Munich and Eintracht Frankfurt. He was promoted to Eintracht Frankfurt's senior team for the 2020–21 season where he made one bench appearance, before leaving when his contract expired on 30 June 2021. He transferred to the Austrian club Admira Wacker on 5 July 2021. He made his professional debut with Admira Wacker in a 3–0 Austrian Football Bundesliga loss to Wolfsberger AC on 21 August 2021.

References

External links
 
 OEFB Profile
 

2001 births
Living people
People from Schwabmünchen
Sportspeople from Swabia (Bavaria)
German footballers
Association football defenders
Austrian Football Bundesliga players
Austrian Regionalliga players
Eintracht Frankfurt players
FC Admira Wacker Mödling players
German expatriate footballers
German expatriate sportspeople in Austria
Expatriate footballers in Austria